Camp Hill is a small ice-free hill, 120 m, which lies  east of Church Point on the south side of Trinity Peninsula. Charted in 1946 by the Falkland Islands Dependencies Survey (FIDS), who so named it because a geological camp was established at the foot of the hill.

References

Hills of Antarctica
Landforms of Trinity Peninsula